Emyvale, Prince Edward Island is an unincorporated community in Queens County, Prince Edward Island, Canada north east of Crapaud.

Communities in Queens County, Prince Edward Island